William Gibson (1808–1867), Irish presbyterian divine, son of James Gibson, a merchant in Ballymena, Co. Antrim, was born there on 8 May 1808.

Education
He attended school in his native town and in the Belfast Academical Institution, where he took the medal for classics in 1829. His collegiate training was obtained partly in Belfast and partly in Edinburgh.

Presbyterian minister
In 1833 he was licensed, and in 1834 ordained minister of First Ballybay, Co. Monaghan. In 1835 a pamphlet which he wrote on ‘The Position of the Church of Ireland and the Duty of Presbyterians in reference to it’ had a wide circulation. In 1840 he became colleague to the Rev. Samuel Hanna, D.D., in Rosemary Street Church, Belfast. In 1842 he was the chief means of establishing the ‘Banner of Ulster,’ a newspaper devoted principally to the interests of Irish presbyterianism. In 1847 he was appointed the General Assembly's Professor of Christian Ethics. In 1859 he became Moderator of the General Assembly.

Death and works
He died suddenly in June 1867. His chief work was ‘The Year of Grace, a History of the Ulster Revival of 1859’, Edinburgh, 1860.

Notes

References

Irish Presbyterian ministers
Moderators of the Presbyterian Church in Ireland
1808 births
1867 deaths
People from Ballymena
People educated at the Royal Belfast Academical Institution